The Asturian or Astur-Leonese dynasty (Spanish dinastía asturiana or astur-leonesa), known in Arabic as the Banī Adhfūnsh ("sons of Alfonso"), was the ruling family of the kingdom of Asturias and León from 739 until 1037. Under their rule, the Astur-Leonese kingdom went from a small mountain enclave to one of the dominant powers in Hispania.

The first ruling family of Asturias lasted only two generations: Pelagius (718–737) and Fafila (737–739). The latter was succeeded by his brother-in-law, Alfonso I, the son of Duke Peter of Cantabria and husband of Fafila's sister, Ermesinda. He founded a dynasty that was to last almost 300 years.

For the first century, rule alternated between Alfonso's descendants and those of his brother, Fruela of Cantabria. With the death of Alfonso I's grandson, Alfonso II (842), Fruela's descendants took the throne permanently, headed by Ramiro I. At the death of Alfonso III (910), the kingdom was divided between his sons. The 10th century was thus characterized by family infighting, which was only brought to an end by the succession of Bermudo II in 984. During this period, however, the power of the neighbouring Kingdom of Pamplona waxed and in 1034 the Pamplonans captured León. The rule of the dynasty was brought to an end three years later when Bermudo III was killed in battle against his brother-in-law, Ferdinand of Castile, of the Jiménez dynasty of Pamplona, who thereafter assumed the throne.

The historiography produced by and for the dynasty, such as the Chronicle of Alfonso III (late 9th century), made Duke Peter a descendant of the Visigothic king Reccared I and stressed the dynasty's supposed Gothic descent.

Family tree

Notes

References
Stanley G. Payne, A History of Spain and Portugal, Volume 1, Chapter Three (The Early Christian Principalities and the Expansion of Asturias-León)

 
Kingdom of Asturias